Yalagüina is a municipality in the Madriz department of Nicaragua.

Geography 
The municipal limits reach Totogalpa in the North, and Pueblo Nuevo to the South. Bordering to the East is Palacagüina and to the West is Somoto. Yalagüina is 205km from Managua.

Municipalities of the Madriz Department

Yalagüina